Czech Lion Award for Best Costume Design is award given to the Czech film with best Costume Design.

Winners

External links

Czech Lion Awards
Awards for film costume design
Awards established in 2013